A characteristic vector may refer to:

 an eigenvector
 an indicator vector